Gartcosh railway station serves the village of Gartcosh, North Lanarkshire, Scotland.

The station was opened on 9 May 2005 by The Princess Royal. The station was built at a cost of over £3 million, provided by Strathclyde Passenger Transport and North Lanarkshire council, on the site of the previous Gartcosh station that closed in 1962.

Services

2017 

On Sundays there is an hourly service to Partick via Queen St LL and to Cumbernauld.

2018/19 

From December 2018, a new half hourly Glasgow - Edinburgh via Cumbernauld and Falkirk Grahamston service started, replacing the hourly DMU service and taking over the existing EMU service between Springburn and Cumbernauld. The service uses new Class 385 EMUs.

Facilities 
The station has a car park, but is not permanently staffed.

References

External links 

 
 Pictures of Gartcosh pre and post railway station - Garnkirk and Glasgow railway
 "HRH The Princess Royal visits Gartcosh" - North Lanarkshire Council website

Railway stations in North Lanarkshire
Former Caledonian Railway stations
Railway stations in Great Britain opened in 1831
Railway stations in Great Britain closed in 1962
Railway stations in Great Britain opened in 2005
Reopened railway stations in Great Britain
Railway stations served by ScotRail